John Garvey (18 Mar 1913 – Nov 1984) was an English professional rugby league footballer who played in the 1930s.

Playing career

International honours
Jack Garvey won caps for England while at St. Helens in 1933 against Other Nationalities, and while at Broughton Rangers in 1936 against Wales.

Championship final appearances
Jack Garvey played  in St. Helens' 9-5 victory over Huddersfield in the Championship Final during the 1931–32 season at Belle Vue, Wakefield on Saturday 7 May 1932.

County Cup Final appearances
Jack Garvey played  in St. Helens' 9-10 defeat by Warrington in the 1932–33 Lancashire County Cup Final during the 1932–33 season at Central Park, Wigan on Saturday 19 November 1932, and played  in Wigan 10-7 victory over Salford in the 1938–39 Lancashire County Cup Final during the 1938–39 season at Station Road, Swinton on Saturday 22 October 1938.

References

External links
Profile at saints.org.uk

1913 births
1984 deaths
Broughton Rangers players
England national rugby league team players
English rugby league players
Place of birth missing
Place of death missing
Rugby league centres
Rugby league five-eighths
Rugby League XIII players
St Helens R.F.C. players
Wigan Warriors players